The 2015 Jalalabad suicide bombing occurred on 18 April 2015. A suicide bomber on a motorcycle, allegedly affiliated with ISIL's Khorasan Province, struck a bank in the city of Jalalabad in Nangarhar Province, Afghanistan, killing at least 33 people and injuring another 100. It marked the first major attack by ISIL Khorasan after it was formed three months earlier, in January 2015.

See also
List of massacres in Afghanistan

References

2015 murders in Afghanistan
2015 suicide bombing
21st-century mass murder in Afghanistan
April 2015 crimes in Asia
April 2015 events in Afghanistan
Attacks on bank buildings
Attacks on buildings and structures in Afghanistan
2015 suicide bombing
2015 suicide bombing 
ISIL terrorist incidents in Afghanistan
Mass murder in 2015
Motorcycle bombings
Suicide bombings in 2015
Suicide bombings in Afghanistan
Terrorist incidents in Afghanistan in 2015
Building bombings in Afghanistan
Attacks in Afghanistan in 2015